The 2005 Summer Universiade, also known as the XXIII Summer Universiade, took place in İzmir, Turkey, in August.

Emblem
The emblem is the letter “U”, inspired by the bird's-eye view of the Gulf of İzmir. This shape has perfectly fit the letter “U” of Universiade, symbolizing its multi-cultural feature, while the smooth outline emphasizes the harmony and uniformity of the Universiade spirit.

Mascot
Name: EFE

Efes are the leaders and heroes of societies that lived in Western Anatolia during the early 1990s. The village dandy Efe, guards and defends all the members of his society and also deals with much of their social work and events as if he is the father of all. For this reason, all the members of the society behave respectfully towards him with strong, emotional, family ties. The Efes were legends in these areas with their smart, fearless, alert dashing behaviors as brave and manly young fellows. They became the symbols of bravery, power and justice throughout the Aegean history.

Nowadays, the word “Efe” is the explanation of a virtuous, brave man who is the symbol of justice in every case. Therefore, we call successful athletes “Efe” stating their various qualifications in one brief word.

Venues
 İzmir Streets — Athletics (Walking, Half-marathon)
 İzmir Atatürk Spor Salonu — Basketball, Volleyball
 Karşıyaka Arena — Basketball, Volleyball
 Halkapinar Spor Salonu — Gymnastics, Diving
 Şirinyer Hipodromu — Archery, Tennis
 Altay Alsancak Stadi — Football
 Sports Authority of İzmir — Shooting, Volleyball
 İzmir Atatürk Stadium — Athletics, Football
 Manisa Özel Yıdare Swimming Complex — Swimming
 İzmir University Sport Complex — Wrestling, Taekwondo, Fencing, Water Polo
 İzmir Port — Sailing

Sports

Core Events

Optional Events

Participants

 
 
 
 
 
 
 
 
 
 
 
 
 
 
 
 
 
 
 
 
 
 
 
 

 
 
 
 
 
 
 
 
 
 
 
 
 
 
 
 
 
 
 
 
 
 
 
 
 
 
 
 
 
 
 
 
 
 
 
 
 
 
 
 
 
 
 
 
 
 
 
 
 
 
 
 
 
 
 
 
 
 
 
 
 
 
 
 
 
 
 
 
 
 
 
 
 
 
 
 
 
 
 
 
 
 
 
 
 
 
 
 
 
 
 
 
 
 
 
 
 
 
  (host)

Medal table

External links
 Official website

 
Universiade
Universiade
2000s in İzmir
August 2005 sports events in Turkey
International sports competitions hosted by Turkey
Multi-sport events in Turkey
Sports competitions in Izmir